Barrera de amor (English: Barrier of Love) is a Mexican telenovela produced by Ernesto Alonso for Televisa in 2005.

On Monday, October 10, 2005, Canal de las Estrellas started broadcasting Barrera de amor weekdays at 8:00pm, replacing Contra viento y marea. The last episode was broadcast on Friday, May 12, 2006 with La fea más bella replacing it on Monday, May 15, 2006.

Yadhira Carrillo and Sergio Reynoso starred as protagonists, Susana Diazayas and Aarón Díaz starred as co-protagonists, while Raquel Olmedo, Alexis Ayala, Gerardo Murguía, Chantal Andere, Armando Araiza and Alexa Damián starred as antagonists. Manuel Landeta and Norma Herrera starred as stellar performances.

Plot
Maria Teresa "Maité" is a beautiful young woman who is engaged to Luis Antonio. Maité was raised by her aunt, Griselda. Maité's mother died giving birth to her and she has never met her father.

According to people in her town, her father was a foreigner named Jose, who lied to Maité's mother, Eloisa, and had left her pregnant.

Jose promised Eloisa to come back but never did, but he left Eloisa a pendant that belonged to Jose's mother. That pendant is all Maria Teresa has from her father. Maité works at her Aunt Griselda's restaurant as a waitress.

Maité goes to the fair where she is accompanied by Adolfo Valladolid, Adolfo pours sleep powder in Maité's drink leaving her dizzy and uncomfortable.

Adolfo takes advantage of her condition and tries to take her to a motel and rape her when he is stopped by Magdalena (who later in the series becomes one of Maité's best friend and also is one of Adolfo's former lovers).

Eventually, Adolfo rapes Maria Teresa later in the series and Maité becomes pregnant. After Luis Antonio is told by Griselda that Adolfo had sexually harassed Maité, Luis Antonio goes off and looks for Adolfo.

Luis Antonio beats up Adolfo, but Doña Jacinta Valladolid, Adolfo’s mother, sues Luis Antonio. Jacinta pays a few of her workers to attack Luis Antonio in prison.

Adolfo was supposed to marry Manola Linares, but Maité interrupts the wedding and says that Adolfo and Manola cannot be married because Adolfo is the father of her baby.

Maité is forced to marry Adolfo after they threaten to kill Luis Antonio in prison. Because Maité loves and cares for Luis Antonio's children, Daniel and Andres, she agrees to marry the rapist.

Her life is a living hell when she has to live with Adolfo and Jacinta. Then, a few months later, Maité gives birth to a beautiful child, Valeria. Jacinta finds a way to make Maité lose custody of her daughter and Jacinta ends up keeping Valeria.

After Maité was forced by Jacinta to leave, Maité goes to Mexico City, and schemes to recover her daughter and get revenge on Jacinta.

There in Mexico City she runs into Magdalena who is pregnant. Maité and Magdalena grow very fond of each other and become best friends.

Maité works in a restaurant in Mexico City and becomes a friend of Victor, the restaurant owner. Magdalena gives birth to a baby girl, Verónica. Years later; Maité returns to recover her daughter but her plan is a failure.

Magdalena is killed but Verónica watches the murder of her mother. Veronica after that day has more than one personality in her.

Veronica always had loved to play dolls with Vera and Violeta (Vera, the greedy and self-centered one and Violeta caring, weak, and respectful, so Veronica said about her dolls).

After that Vera and Violeta became Verónica's personality. Veronica is also Valeria's half sister. Maité decides to take care of Verónica since Magdalena was a very good friend to her. Maité and Victor adopt Verónica.

After 17 years Maité finally returns to her home town and gets revenge on Jacinta. Valeria and Andrés fall in love without knowing their parents had a relationship.

Later, Valeria and Andrés secretly marry. Valeria finds out that she is pregnant and tries to tell Andres and they get in a fight. She doesn't tell Andrés that she is pregnant.

Cast

Main
Yadhira Carrillo as María Teresa "Maité" Galván Martínez
Sergio Reynoso as Luis Antonio Romero
Raquel Olmedo as Jacinta López Reyes Vda. de Valladolid
Alexis Ayala as Federico Valladolid Gómez/Federico Valladolid Gómez
Chantal Andere as Manola Linares de Zamora
Norma Herrera as Remedios Gómez
Gerardo Murguía as Adolfo Valladolid López
Manuel Landeta as Víctor García Betancourt
Aarón Díaz as Andrés Romero
Susana Diazayas as Valeria Valladolid Galván
Armando Araiza as Rodrigo Zamora Linares
Alexa Damián as Verónica García Galván/Vera/Violeta

Recurring
 
Alberto Agnesi as Daniel Romero
Ana Brenda Contreras as Juana "Juanita" Sánchez
Arturo Posadas as Baldomero Sánchez
Luis Gimeno as Josefo Maldonado
Aarón Hernán as José Maldonado
Juan Peláez as Sergio López Reyes
Antonio Medellín as Octavio Mendoza
Emilia Carranza as Josefina Maldonado
Jorge Vargas as Miguel Franco
Guillermo Aguilar as Don Elías
Yolanda Ciani as Doña Norma
Julio Monterde as Father Anselmo
Rossana San Juan as Magdalena
David Ostrosky as Ulises Santillana
Juan Carlos Casasola as Pancho
Graciela Bernardos as Griselda Martínez
Aleyda Gallardo as Martina de Sánchez
Paty Díaz as Nuria de Romero
Raymundo Capetillo as Nicolás Linares
Xavier Marc as Gustavo Zamora
Rosángela Balbó as Cayetana Linares
David Ramos as Dionisio Pérez y Pérez
Ignacio Guadalupe as Teodoro Sánchez
Mario Cid as Father Raúl
Rosita Bouchot as Leticia
Lucy Tovar as Bertha
Virginia Gimeno as Cleotilde Ramos
Jerardo Rioja as Rafael Garduño
Mario del Río as Guillermo
Elizabeth Aguilar as Jacaranda
Tere Valadez as Elvira
Elsy Reyes as Sister María de Jesús
Ruth Sheinfeld as Mónica
Antonio Miguel as Nabuco
Óscar Ferretti as Celerino
Paola Flores as Evelia
Joana Benedek as Leonela
Alejandro Correa as Andrés Romero (child)
Daniel Berlanga as Daniel Romero (child)
Miguel Martínez as Andrés Romero (adolescent)
Carlos Speitzer as Daniel Romero (adolescent)
Ernesto Bojalil as Cantinero
María Dolores Oliva as Rosaura
Claudia Ortega as Reyna
Antonio Vela as Omar Cardona
Haydee Navarra as Berenice
Bertha Kain
Jorge Ulises Santillana
Thelma Dorantes
María Dolores Oliva
Paola Riquelme
Pablo Domínguez
Patricia Ramírez
Mario Limantour
Elena de Tellitu
Allioth Ojeda
Suhey
Furby
Diego Serrano
Manuel Ojeda
Scarlet Hernández
Thania Ortiz
Andrea García
Nadia Alejandre

Special participation
Federico Pizarro as Pedro Valladolid
Pedro Armendáriz, Jr. as Don Pedro Valladolid
Farah Abud as Jacinta López Reyes de Valladolid (young)
Manuel "Flaco" Ibáñez as Nicanor López
Adriana Laffan as Ramona Reyes de López
Cristina Bernal as Remedios Gómez (young)
Sergio Argueta as José Maldonado (young)
Daniel Habif as Sergio López Reyes (young)

Soundtracks
"Como Duele (Barrera de Amor)" - Noelia
"Maldita Soledad" - Aracely Arámbula
"Lágrimas Rotas" - Vanessa Colaiutta
"Me Acorde de Ti" - Mijares
"Solo El y Yo" - Pandora
"Tan Dentro" - Lourdes Santiago
"Sin Ti No Soy Nada" - Amaral
"Hablan" - Ricardo Montaner
"Como Sería" - Soraya
"Luna Mágica" - Rocío Banquells
"Quiero Amanecer Con Alguien" - Daniela Romo
"Se Me Hizo Fácil" - Consorcio

Awards

References

External links

 at esmas.com 

2005 telenovelas
Mexican telenovelas
2005 Mexican television series debuts
2006 Mexican television series endings
Spanish-language telenovelas
Television shows set in Mexico City
Televisa telenovelas